Canoeing was a demonstration sport at the 1924 Summer Olympics in Paris.  It was the first time that the sport was part of the Olympic program, and it would become a full medal sport 12 years later at the 1936 Games.

The French Olympic Committee, as hosts of these Games, asked the Canadian Olympic Committee to demonstrate the sport in Paris.  Races were arranged between the Canadian Canoe Association and the Washington Canoe Club from the United States.  Events were held for each of 1, 2, and 4 paddlers for both single-end paddles (modern canoe style) and double-end paddles (modern kayak style).

Event results
One paddler, simple paddle (single blade) (now C-1)

One paddler, double bladed paddle (now K-1)

Two paddlers, simple paddle (single blade) (now C-2)

Two paddlers, double bladed paddle (now K-2)

Four paddlers, simple paddle (single blade) (now C-4)

Four paddlers, double bladed paddle (now K-4)

Medal table

References
 

 
1924 Summer Olympics events
1924